The Chattel is a lost 1916 silent film drama directed by Frederick A. Thomson and starring stage actor E. H. Sothern. It was produced and distributed by the Vitagraph Company of America.

Cast
E. H. Sothern - Blake Waring
Peggy Hyland - Leila Bard
Rose Tapley - Mrs. Delavan (*as Rose E. Tapley)
Charles Kent - Mr. Bard
Lark Taylor - Walter Horley
Florence Radinoff - Maid

References

External links
The Chattel at IMDb.com

1916 films
American silent feature films
Lost American films
Vitagraph Studios films
American black-and-white films
Silent American drama films
1916 drama films
Films directed by Frederick A. Thomson
1916 lost films
Lost drama films
1910s American films